Raghunathrao Bhat also known as Ragho Ballal or Ragho Bharari (18 August 1734 – 11 December 1783) was the 11th Peshwa of the Maratha Empire for a brief period from 1773 to 1774. He was known among the Hindus for his extremely successful North-western campaign of 1757-58 and for his works to liberate the Hindu holy places of Kashi and Ayodhya.

Early life

Raghunathrao Bhat, also known as "Raghoba", "Raghoba Dada" and "Ragho Bharari," was the younger brother of Nanasaheb Peshwa. His father was Peshwa Bajirao I & mother was Kashibai. Raghunathrao was born in Mahuli near Satara on 8 December 1734. Much of his childhood was spent in Satara. A small time after his birth, his step-mother, Mastani gave birth to his brother, Krishna Rao, also named Shamsher Bahadur I

Maratha conquests

In his early years he fought with great success in the north. His expedition during 1753–1755 was concluded by an advantageous treaty with the Jats. Raghunathrao imprisoned Mughal Emperor Ahmad Shah Bahadur and made Alamgir II his puppet monarch. He returned after taking over several forts, but made little economic gains.

Second Northern Expedition (1757-1758) 

At the end of 1756, Ahmad Shah Abdali was preparing to invade India and Delhi once again. Nanasaheb Peshwa, Ragunathrao, Sidhojiraje Gharge-Desai-Dehmukh, Malharrao Holkar and Dattaji Shinde prepared an army and it was decided that Marathas being the protectors of the Mughal Emperor would make another expedition to North India to stop another Afghan invasion. Nanasaheb Peshwa gave the command of this expedition to Ragunathrao and Malharrao Holkar was asked to assist Ragunathrao. Malharrao Holkar left for Indore at the end of 1756 and Ragunathrao followed him with his army after few weeks in October 1756.

Maratha affairs in Rajputana (February 1757 - July 1757)

Raghunathrao reached Indore on 14 February 1757 with Santajirao Wable and was joined by Malharrao Holkar. The purpose of Raghunathrao's northern expedition was twofold: first was to defend the Mughal Emperor from Afghan invasion and second to collect taxes and tributes to meet with Peshwa's growing debts. So in the middle of May 1757, Raghunathrao sent an advance force of 20,000 into the Ganga Doab to recover lost possessions of Marathas, and with Malharrao Holkar and the remaining force decided to invade Rajputana to collect taxes. Due to the fortified lands and the martial nature of the people, Raghunathrao was unable to even gather funds for the subsistence of his army and constantly sent letters to Poona asking Peshwa for funds.“I am feeding myself only by looting villages. In this country most places are fortified, and not a grain of food can be obtained without fighting. I have no money, and cannot even raise a loan. My soldiers have been fasting for one or two days at a time.” - Raghunathrao's letter to PeshwaThe Maratha army moved through Mewar from Indore and on its way collected a ransom of one lakh from Jawad and attacked Ranikheda in March 1757. Reaching Jaipur in April 1757, Ragunathrao demanded pending payments from Madho Singh and laid siege to Barwada, then belonging to the Shekhawats. Lacking siege materials the Maratha army could not force the Shekhawats to surrender, and the long-standing siege started taking its toll on the Maratha army. Kaniram, who was the Jaipur minister offered Raghunathrao payment as agreed in the past between Marathas and Rajputs, but Raghunathrao was adamant. He demanded 40 to 50 lakhs and territory worth 14 lakhs or threatened to wait out the siege and take territory worth 40 to 50 lakhs from the Rajputs.  Madho Singh, king of Jaipur refused all of Raghunathrao's terms and asked all his feudatories to fortify their posts and stay vigilant.

The Maratha army in Rajputana at the time did not have the numbers necessary to storm forts of Barwada and Jaipur and so on 12 July 1757 Raghunathrao agreed to peace talks with Madho Singh. He accepted a payment of eleven lakhs from Jaipur, six of which were paid immediately. On 12 July 1757, Raghunathrao wrote to Peshwa:“I have no money, nor is any loan available. My troops are in debt. Prices here are very high. I am daily getting my food only by sacking the villages.” 

- Raghunathrao's letter to Peshwa on 12th July 1757 But unfortunately no help provided by Peshwa from Pune. Having thus concluded the business in Rajputana, Raghunathrao and Malharrao Holkar with the remaining Maratha forces started making for Delhi to liberate it from the Afghan agents at the end of July 1757, by which point of time Ahmad Shah Abdali was well away in his country.

Marathas enter the Ganga Doab (May 1757 - July 1757)

The Maratha troops sent by Raghunathrao to recover lost possessions in the Ganga Doab under the command of Sakharam Bapu, Vithal Shivdev, Tatya Gangadhar and Antaji Mankeshwar into the Ganga Doab reached Agra in May 1757. On reaching Agra, the Marathas made peace with Suraj Mal and advanced to Yamuna. They crossed Yamuna at Agra, occupied Etawah and Sikandra, and encamped at Kasganj on the southern bank of the Ganga on 17 June 1757. Antaji Mankeshwar went to Anupshahar about 2 July 1757. Meerut which was occupied by Najib Khan's agents resisted the Marathas but were swiftly defeated. Imad-ul-mulk sent his diwan Nagar Mal to Anupshahar to establish friendly relations with the Marathas once again. Shuja-ud-daulah had agreed to remain neutral in the conflict between Najib-ud-daulah and the Marathas. Thus most of the Doab was freed of Najib's agents and came under the control of Marathas.

Battle of Delhi (July 1757 - September 1757)

Ahmad Shah Abdali, before heading home in Afghanistan, kept Alamgir II on the throne with Imad-ul-Mulk as his wazir. But Abdali gave all the real power to Najib-ud-Daulah, his supreme agent in India and made him Mir Bakshi. Alamgir II, Imad-ul-Mulk all wanted to be free from Najib Khan's dominance and asked the Marathas for aid in liberating Delhi from Afghan influence. Ragunathrao agreed and marched on the imperial capital in July 1757. Sakharam Bapu who was present in the Doab region at the time, occupied Patparganj, and Shamsher Bahadur with the artillery division reached Rewari on 27 July 1757. Grain was stopped from entering the city. Najib Khan in preparation of the coming battle, dug trenches at Khizirabad outside the city to halt the cavalry advance of the Marathas. Najib Khan on hearing of Ragunathrao's advance, sent his wakil Meghraj to Imad-ul-Mulk to seek terms of peace, but Imad proposed humiliating terms which were unacceptable to Najib. And so there was no other alternative to settle this conflict other than war.

Raghunathrao reaches Delhi and the Attack Begins (August 1757 – September 1757)

Raghunathrao reached Khizirabad on 11 August 1757 with his lieutenants where he was joined by Sakharam Bapu who had crossed over from Doab. Raghunathrao sent two Maratha divisions to attack Delhi. The first division fought their way to the old city through Lal Darwaza and captured it swiftly after defeating Najib's troops under the leadership of Bakhtawar Khan. The second division attacked from the south-east side of the city, where Qutb Shah commanding 2,500 troops fired bombardments on the Maratha soldiers from the Blue Bastion. Realizing that the old city was lost, Najib Khan and Qutb Shah retreated to the inner City with all their Rohilla troops. In retaliation, Rohillas attacked and plundered Imad-ul-mulk's house in Delhi, and dishonored Imad-ul-mulk's women in his harem. Imad-ul-mulk met with Raghunathrao and cemented an alliance with the Marathas.

The Marathas were unable to storm the fort from the south, so Raghunathrao decided to attack the fort from all sides and lay siege to the place. Grain supply to the fort was stopped and Maratha troops encircled the fort. Najib countering these plans placed guards and canons on all sides of the fort, preventing the Marathas from getting in the range of these canons.

Malharrao Holkar with Vithal Shivdev led the Maratha soldiers to attack Delhi fort from the Northern side of Kashmir Gate. Imad-ul-mulk's troops under Bahadur Khan Baluch and Jamil-ud-din Khan supported them. Santajirao Wable and Manaji Paygude entrenched himself opposite Kabul Gate in the north-western section of the Fort. On 25 August 1757, Bahadur Khan and Nagar Mal led an attack on the outskirts of the fort, forcing the Rohilla defenders to fall back to the Fort. Najib Khan had the long range canons dragged to the northern section of the fort and commenced bombardment on enemy's troops which resulted in several hundreds of Bahadur Khan's troops being killed. After this, the fighting stopped once again. Najib being all alone in the fort with his soldiers being reduced to 2000 men, sought to make terms by sending his diplomat (wakil) Meghraj to Malharrao. Raghunathrao set forth terms that Najib Khan should resign his post of Mir Bakshi (Paymaster-General), vacate the fort with all his troops and withdraw to his Rohilla jagirs and pay an indemnity of 50 to 60 lakhs. Najib Khan preferred to die instead of accepted such humiliating and exorbitant demands and prepared the defense of the fort with renewed vigor.

Peace talks crumble and Battle renewed (30 August 1757 – 1 September 1757)

The battle was renewed on the night of 29 August 1757, when Raghunathrao attacked the Delhi Gate in the south and Imad-ul-mulk attacked the Lahor Gate in the North-west. The fort was bombarded by Maratha canons from all sides, resulting in two of the bastions of Delhi Gate being demolished. The canon fire from all sides of the fort continued till 31 August 1757. Najib's soldiers tried forming a counterattack and drove away Imad-ul-mulk and Ahmad Khan Bangash's men from Lahore Gate. Another sortie was successfully executed by Najib's soldiers at Turkoman Gate, where Dilel Singh (diwan of Wazir), lost some soldiers.

Najib-ud-daulah surrenders and agrees for Peace Talks (September 1757)

With famine raging in the city, many soldiers started deserting Najib Khan and leaving the city, and only a few remaining loyal with him. Being hopelessly outnumbered Najib realized that surrender was the only option. Malharrao convinced Raghunathrao and Imad-ul-mulk for peace while Abdul Ahad Khan pressed Najib to agree to peace. On 3 September 1757, Qutb Shah and Najib Khan visited Malharrao's camp at Qudsiabad and accepted all terms of surrender. This created some animosity between Malharrao and Raghunathrao, as Raghunathrao was in command of the Northern expedition and peace talks were conducted by Malharrao Holkar.

The peace became operative on 6 September 1757 where Najib vacated his seat with all the Rohilla soldiers and their belongings and encamped at Wazirabad. Raghunathrao released all Rohilla prisoners. Grain was brought from ferries and supplied to the starving city and Maratha soldiers started guarding the city. Imad-ul-Mulk replaced Najib's agents in the city with his own men o high posts. Ahmad Khan Bangash was made imperial Paymaster-General. Thus, Delhi was freed from Rohilla and Afghan influence by the wazir and Marathas.

On 22 October 1757, Raghunathrao and Malharrao Holkar left Delhi after celebrating the Dasahara festival and entered Doab. Raghunathrao marched to Garh Mukteshwar to bathe in those holy waters and Malharrao Holkar started plundering Saharanpur district, which was Najib Khan's jagir. Najib with his Afghan forces retreated against the Maratha onslaught and moved to his interior domains. Then, Raghunathrao and Malharrao decided to withdraw from the Doab, and gave its lands to the Wazir, Imad-ul-Mulk and started focusing on Punjab expedition to liberate that province from the Durrani empire.

Maratha Invasion of Punjab (October 1757-May 1758)

Siege of Sarhind (February 1758- March 1758) 
Ahmad Shah Durrani (of present-day Afghanistan) had annexed the province of Punjab from the Mughal Empire in his invasion of 1757. He had appointed his son Timur Shah as the governor of Punjab province. Timur Shah began strengthening his position in Punjab by sending Sarafraz Khan to deal with Adina Beg, the Mughal governor of Punjab. Adina Beg successfully repelled Sarafraz Khan's invasion, but he knew his cause was doomed as he only had 10,000 troops with him. So he opened negotiations with Raghunathrao who was currently in Delhi. Adina Beg promised to pay 1 lakh rupees for each marching day and half a lakh for each day of halt.

Hearing of this, Abdus Samad Khan Mohmand of Sarhind, a close ally of Abdali, marched to Thaneshwar in October 1757, where he was joined by Najib-ud-daulah's son. Raghunathrao and Malharrao avoided the bait of attacking Abdus Samad Khan and circled around Delhi for a time. Then in December 1757, Malharrao laid siege to Kunjpura and raided most of the territories from Delhi to Thaneshwar. At this time, Abdus Samad Khan was on an expedition against Ala Singh and was greatly alarmed at the approach of the Marathas. He quickly settled the expedition and returned to Sarhind fort on 12 January 1758 and started making defensive preparations. But Malharrao again did not rise to the bait and retreated from Kunjpura after exacting a tribute of five lakhs.

Raghunathrao entered Punjab in February 1758 with Malharrao Holkar, Dattaji Shinde, Jankoji Shinde and Shamsher Bahadur I (Krishna Rao) to lay siege of Sirhind fort. He was joined by Adina Beg's forces and Sikh mercenaries. Maratha raiding bands spread all over the district to plunder the villages around. The siege lasted few days, after which on 21 March 1758, Abdus Samad Khan along with Jangbaz Khan and other Afghan captains were captured by the Marathas while escaping, though they were well treated by Raghunathrao. Thus, Sarhind was captured by the Marathas. The Marathas and Adina Beg's forces advanced to Lahore to liberate it from Afghan supremacy.

Siege of Lahore (April 1758) 
Timur Shah's position at Lahore was a delicate one, Ahmad Shah Abdali was busy in Khurasan with a rebellion, the Lahore fort was in a state of disrepair, he was surrounded with a hostile population of Sikhs and he himself had very little soldiers to make a defence. So Timur Shah decided it wise to retreat against the Maratha onslaught. Timur Shah fled Lahore on 19 April 1758 and crossed Ravi River with all his troops and supplies. When the Marathas and Mughals arrived at Lahore, they took Lahore fort with no resistance from the Afghans. The Marathas pursued Timur Shah and the Afghans, first crossing Ravi river, then defeating the rear guard of Mir Hazar Khan. Timur Shah alarmed by the possible scenario of being captured crossed Chenab river with his Durrani clansmen, leaving all his other soldiers and supplies behind. They were captured by the Marathas and Mughals. The Marathas later crossed the Chenab river and captured Attock, Multan, Rohtas, Dera Ghazi Khan and Peshawar. 

On 15 September 1758, only a few months after victory, Adina Beg passed away at Khanpur near Hoshiarpur. The Marathas appointed Dattaji Scindia and then Sabaji Shinde to succeed him as the governor of the Punjab. In 1760, Ahmad Shah Abdali's forces defeated and killed Dattaji Scindia in Battle of Barari Ghat near modern-day Delhi. To counter this sitiation, Raghunathrao was instructed to campaign north. Raghunathrao's requested a large military and financial investment since their ally Adina Beg was dead. This request was denied by Sadashivrao Bhau, Raghunathrao's cousin and Diwan of Peshwa. Since Raghunathrao declined to march north, Sadashivrao Bhau was made commander in chief of the Maratha Army, under whom the Third Battle of Panipat was fought.

Regency
After Maratha defeat at Third Battle of Panipat, his brother Nanasaheb Peshwa's death and his half brother's (Shamsher Bahadur]]) death in 1761, the Peshwa title was passed on to Madhavrao I, second son of Nanasaheb. Madhavrao was a minor when appointed Peshwa. Therefore, Raghunathrao was appointed as the regent to the young Peshwa. He soon fell out of favor with Madhavrao and even tried to conspire against him by joining the Nizam of Hyderabad against the Peshwa. The alliance was defeated at Ghodegaon, and Raghunathrao was placed under house arrest. After Madhavrao I's death in 1772, Raghunathrao was released from house arrest. He then became the regent of Madhavrao's younger brother Narayanrao. Together with his wife Anandibai, he had his nephew Narayanrao murdered.

Legend has it that the original command was "Hyala Dharaava" (Have him seized) written on a parchment of paper, and while the message was handed over to Anandibai to pass it on to the minions, she changed the letters to mean "Hyala Maraava" (Have him killed). And therefore when the assassins attacked the young Peshwa, he ran over outside of the house of Raghoba crying "Kaakaa, malaa waachwaa" (Uncle, save me). His cry fell on deaf ears as Raghoba stood by imagining Narayanrao to be overacting while his nephew was eventually killed. After Narayanrao's murder, Raghoba became Peshwa, but he was shortly overthrown by Nana Phadnavis and 11 other administrators in what is called "The Baarbhaai Conspiracy" (Conspiracy by the Twelve). Raghunathrao was tried, convicted, and sentenced to death by the justice Ram Shastri Prabhune but the sentence was never carried out.

At Kasegaon near Pandharpur the first battle between the Baarbhai and Raghobadada took place in 1774. He then went to Khambhat with hope of getting help from the British, who did not help but transported him to Surat from their ship.

At Surat a treaty was signed between Raghunathrao and the British East India Company on 6 March 1775. According to the treaty it was decided that Thane, Vasai and Sashti were to be handed over to the British, and in return the Company would assist Raghunathrao to become the Peshwa.

However, the company was not yet ready for war, so that the treaty between the Baarbhai and the company was signed at Purandar. After the Treaty of Purandar (1776), the Company openly distanced itself from Raghunathrao and asked him to live as their pensioner. But due to the fear of the Baarbhai, Raghunathrao was unhappy to leave Surat and in fact the Company did not insist on it, so he kept on living there.

In 1776, Raghunathrao unsuccessfully tried to get help from the Portuguese. After that he came to Bombay. During that period Company gave him Rs 15000. At the Battle of Talegaon, the East India Company was defeated. A treaty was signed at Vadgaon according to which Raghunathrao's claim on the position of Peshwa was rescinded.

Death and aftermath

Raghunathrao Bajirao moved to Kopargaon at his trusted Sardar Santajirao Wable's place and died on 11 December 1783 of unknown causes at Kopargaon. He had two sons Baji Rao II and Chimaji Rao II; in addition, he had adopted Amrit Rao.  After his death, his wife Anandi Bai and his three sons were kept in confinement by the Peshwa's minister Nana Fadnavis. After the death of Peshwa Madhav Rao II, Nana Phadnavis and the powerful chief Daulat Rao Scindia installed Chimaji Rao and Baji Rao II as puppet Peshwas in quick succession.

In popular culture
 In the 1994 Hindi TV series The Great Maratha, Raghoba's character was portrayed by Bhushan Jeevan.
 In the 2014 Indian Marathi-language film, Rama Madhav, he is portrayed by Prasad Oak.
 In 2019 Hindi film Panipat, he was portrayed by Kashyap Parulekar.

See also
 Battle of Attock
 Javji Bamble

References

 Britannica article

1734 births
1783 deaths
Peshwa dynasty
People of the Maratha Empire
Marathi people
18th-century Indian monarchs
Indian Hindus
Hindu monarchs